John Doman (born January 9, 1945) is an American actor best known for playing Maryland State Police Superintendent, Deputy Police Commissioner and Major William Rawls on HBO series The Wire (2002–2008), Colonel Edward Galson on Oz (2001), Dr. Deraad in ER (1999–2003), Rodrigo Borgia in the international television series Borgia (2011–2014), Don Carmine Falcone in Fox's show Gotham (2014–2017), and Bruce Buttler in The Affair (2014–2019).

Early life and education
Doman was born in Philadelphia, Pennsylvania, and is an alumnus of Northeast Catholic High School. Doman graduated from North in 1962 where he was an All-Catholic League football player and member of the school's Hall of Fame. He received a Bachelor of Arts in English Literature from the University of Pennsylvania in 1966. During his years at Penn, he was a three-year letterman and starting defensive back with the Quakers football team from 1963 to 1965. He also earned a Master of Business Administration degree in marketing from Pennsylvania State University in 1972.

In between his time at Penn and Penn State, Doman served with the United States Marine Corps, beginning with his enrollment in its Officer Candidates School at Quantico, Virginia. He was commissioned a Second Lieutenant in March 1967 and served with the 3rd Marine Division in the Vietnam War. 

Following graduation, he spent nearly two decades in the advertising business, starting with a role at SSC&B Advertising and Norman Craig & Kummel. He was one of the first six employees at TBWA New York when it debuted in 1977. Doman concluded his 14 year career with TBWA as Executive Vice President, Head of Business Development, responsible for a new-business program which resulted in Agency of the Year honors from Adweek in 1990. Doman pivoted his career from an advertising executive to a full-time actor when he was cast in a commercial for AT&T in 1991.

Acting career
Doman has made cameo appearances in Cop Land and Mystic River. He had minor roles in The Opponent, Die Hard with a Vengeance and Blue Valentine. In 2004, he appeared in the third installment of action-film series Sniper. His TV appearances include: guest-star in the Star Trek: Deep Space Nine episode "Shakaar", Dr. Carl Deraad in Seasons 5 and 6 of ER, and bad-guy CEO Walter Kendrick on Season 2 of Damages. He provided the voice of Don Morello in the videogame Mafia: City of Lost Heaven; Caesar in the videogame Fallout New Vegas; commercials for Michelin tires and Home Depot.  In 2013 he began narrating videos for the Philadelphia Eagles. 

During his career, Doman has portrayed several different characters in numerous episodes of Law & Order and Law & Order: Special Victims Unit. He also guest-starred in Law & Order: Trial by Jury, and Law & Order: Criminal Intent. In total, he has played 11 different characters in the Law & Order franchise.

From 2010 to 2011, Doman appeared in three episodes of Rizzoli & Isles as a mob enforcer. This reunited him with Sasha Alexander, who he had previously worked within the NCIS Season 2 episode "Doppelganger", where Doman played Lt. Cheney, the head of local civilian law enforcement. He played Rodrigo Borgia in the Borgia series in 2011 and starred in director Pieter Gaspersz's AFTER opposite Kathleen Quinlan.

Other roles he has had include: Senator Ross Garrison in Person of Interest; Helen's (Maura Tierney) father in the Showtime drama The Affair; Bishop Charles Eddis in House of Cards; Caesar in Fallout: New Vegas, and the U.S. Ambassador to Germany in Season 2 of Berlin Station. He has worked on the stage in New York and in major regional theaters around the country in plays by playwrights ranging from Sam Shepard to Shakespeare, including Stephen Adly Guirgis' Our Lady of 121st Street at the Signature Theater in New York City. Doman has also appeared in promotional advertisements for Versus Television.

Filmography

Film

Television

Video games

References

External links
 
 'Wire's' Doman a Philly native
 education training

1945 births
Living people
20th-century American male actors
21st-century American male actors
Male actors from Philadelphia
American male film actors
American male television actors
American male voice actors
United States Marine Corps personnel of the Vietnam War
Penn Quakers football players
United States Marine Corps officers